Plaza España metro station may refer to:

Plaza de España-Noviciado (Madrid Metro) in Madrid
Plaça Espanya metro station in Barcelona
Plaça d'Espanya, a Metrovalencia station

See also
Plaza de España (disambiguation)